Ibrahim al-Abdullah (born ) is a Lebanese journalist and politician.

Background 
Al-Abdallah studied at the Sagesse College and obtained a license degree in political science. He went on to work as a journalist; between 1953 and 1958 he worked at the ad-Diyar newspaper. He was also employed as an officer in the Chamber of Deputies.

Al-Abdallah was the son of a Shiite political leader, Ali al-Abdallah, who had been serving in the parliament. Ibrahim al-Abdallah ran for parliament in the 1960 election as an independent candidate in the Marjeyoun-Hasbaya constituency, securing a seat.

Ibrahim al-Abdallah ran for parliament again in the 1968 election in Marjeyoun-Hasbaya constituency. He was the running mate of As'ad al-As'ad. He obtained 5,593 votes, not enough to regain his seat.

References

Lebanese politicians
Lebanese journalists
1920s births
Possibly living people